The Yankee Girl is a 1915 silent film comedy produced by Oliver Morosco, distributed by Paramount Pictures and starring Blanche Ring, from the Broadway stage. This film though a comedy is actually based on Ring's 1910 musical-comedy play of the same name. Being a silent film of course Ring's singing could not be heard by the film audiences but they would get the rare chance of seeing this Broadway star in a film as many could not afford to make the journey to New York to see her in person in the play.

This film was shot at Pasadena California.

It is preserved in the Library of Congress and at UCLA Film and Television.

Cast
Blanche Ring – Jessie Gordon
Forrest Stanley – Jack Lawrence
Herbert Standing – President Ambroce Castroba
Howard Davies – James Seavey
Harry Fisher Jr. – Willie Fitzmaurice
Robert Dunbar – Philip Gordon
Joe Ray – Ramon Morales
Bonita Darling – Winnie Gordon
Lydia Yeamans Titus – Jessie's Aunt
Syd De Gray – Wiggs

References

External links
The Yankee Girl at IMDb.com
allmovie/synopsis
lobby poster

1915 films
American films based on plays
1915 comedy-drama films
American silent feature films
American black-and-white films
1910s American films
Silent American comedy-drama films